Giovan Battista Ludovisi (John Baptist Ludovisi)  (1647 - 24 August 1699) was the Prince of Piombino, serving from 1665 until his death in 1699.

Life 
Giovan Battista Ludovisi was the son and heir of Niccolò I Ludovisi and his third wife Costanza Pamphili, sister of Vatican cardinal Camillo Pamphili. He had three siblings, Lavinia (wife of Girolamo Acquaviva, Duke of Atri), Olimpia, and Ippolita. Giovan inherited his parents' domains the Ludovisi de Candia-Pamphili, including the Principality of Piombino on 1 September 1665. In 1690 he sold the Duchy of Fiano to the Ottoboni family of Venice. 

Giovan married in 1669 to Mary of the House of Montcada, daughter of William Ramon de Moncada, Marquis of Aytona. Mary died in Rome in 1694 without leaving children.

In 1697, Giovan married a second time with Anna Maria Arduino, Furnari dei Notarbartolo. From his marriage to Arduino, they produced one son, Niccolò II Ludovisi born c.1698, and who died in 1699 at the age of one.

After his death, the principality succession fell to his young son under the regency of his widow, and a few months later after his son died, it was passed on to his sister Olimpia as Princess of Piombino.

References

1647 births
1699 deaths
Princes of Piombino
17th-century Italian nobility
Knights of the Golden Fleece